The Adele language is spoken in central eastern Ghana and central western Togo. It belongs to the geographic group of Ghana Togo Mountain languages (traditionally called the Togorestsprachen or Togo Remnant languages) of the Kwa branch of Niger–Congo. The speakers themselves, the Adele people, call the language Gidire.

Writing system
In Ghana, the Ghana Institute of Linguistics, Literacy and Bible Translation  (en) (GILLBT) developed an alphabet to translate the Bible into Adele.

The Adele alphabet used in Togo is essentially the same, however Rongier uses fewer digraphs at the index of his Adele-French dictionary.

References

 Bernd Heine, Die Verbreitung und Gliederung der Togorestsprachen. Berlin, Dietrich Reimer, 1968.

External links
 Listen to a sample of Adele from Global Recordings Network

Ghana–Togo Mountain languages
Languages of Ghana
Languages of Togo